Trading Secrets with the Moon is the third studio album by rock band The Adventures, released in 1989.

It failed to capitalise on the previous album's success and contained no hit singles. The album itself reached #64 on the UK Albums Chart.

Unlike the band's previous releases, Theodore and Friends and The Sea of Love, the album was panned by critics, with AllMusic giving the album a retrospective 1.5 stars out of 5.

Track listing

All songs written by Pat Gribben, except where noted:
 "Your Greatest Shade of Blue"
 "Scarlet"
 "Washington Deceased"
 "Don't Blame It on the Moon"
 "Bright New Morning"
 "Love's Lost Town"
 "Desert Rose" (Pat Gribben, Lloyd Cole)
 "Hey Magdalene"
 "Sweet Burning Love"
 "Never Gonna Change"
 "Put Me Together Again"

References

1990 albums
The Adventures albums
Albums produced by Clive Langer
Albums produced by Alan Winstanley
Elektra Records albums